KYBE 95.7 FM is a radio station licensed to Frederick, Oklahoma.  The station broadcasts a classic country format and is owned by Monte Spearman and Gentry Todd Spearman, through licensee High Plains Radio Network, LLC. The station began broadcasting on August 15, 1982, and aired a middle of the road (MOR) format.

References

External links
KYBE's official website

YBE
Country radio stations in the United States
Radio stations established in 1982
1982 establishments in Oklahoma